Andrew Todd (born June 13, 1989) is a Canadian adaptive rower who competes in international level events. He is a double World champion and a Paralympic bronze medalist at the 2016 Summer Paralympics. He competes in the mixed coxed four and coxless pair.

In May 2013, Todd was given an invitation to compete in the Canadian men's lightweight fours national team. He was struck by a bus three days after his invitation in London, Ontario, the school bus failed to stop at a stop sign and hit Todd and some of his teammates who were cycling on the outskirts of the city. Todd's lower limbs were worst affected as the back wheels of the bus were crushing his pelvis, he also had a fractured kneecap in the accident. He suffered life changing injuries mainly to his right leg; he had more than ten surgeries but he could not regain strength in his leg.

References

External links
 
 

1989 births
Living people
Sportspeople from Thunder Bay
Paralympic rowers of Canada
Rowers at the 2016 Summer Paralympics
Medalists at the 2016 Summer Paralympics